Hendron is a surname:
Hendron is a surname of the Scottish Clan Henderson

Hendron surnamed persons:

 Henry Hendron, English barrister
 Máire Hendron, Northern Irish politician
 Jim Hendron, politician
 Joe Hendron, politician
 Timothy Hendron, spree shooter

Hendron named places:
 Hendron, Kentucky, United States

Clan Henderson
Scottish surnames
Surnames of Scottish origin